In economics, nominal value is measured in terms of money, whereas real value is measured against goods or services. A real value is one which has been adjusted for inflation, enabling comparison of quantities as if the prices of goods had not changed on average; therefore, changes in real value exclude the effect of inflation. In contrast, a nominal value has not been adjusted for inflation, and so changes in nominal value reflect at least in part the effect of inflation but will not hold the same purchasing power.

Commodity bundles, price indices and inflation

A commodity bundle is a sample of goods, which is used to represent the sum total of goods across the economy to which the goods belong, for the purpose of comparison across different times (or locations). 

At a single point of time, a commodity bundle consists of a list of goods, and each good in the list has a market price and a quantity. The market value of the good is the market price times the quantity at that point of time. The nominal value of the commodity bundle at a point of time is the total market value of the commodity bundle, depending on the market price, and the quantity, of each good in the commodity bundle which are current at the time. 

A price index is the relative price of a commodity bundle. A price index can be measured over time, or at different locations or markets. If it is measured over time, it is a series of values  over time . 

A time series price index is calculated relative to a base or reference date.  is the value of the index at the base date. For example, if the base date is (the end of) 1992,  is the value of the index at (the end of) 1992. The price index is typically normalized to start at 100 at the base date, so  is set to 100.

If the price of the commodity bundle has increased by one percent over the first period after the base date, then P1 = 101.

The inflation rate  between time  and time  is the change in the price index divided by the price index value at time :

 

expressed as a percentage.

Real value
The nominal value of a commodity bundle tends to change over time. In contrast, by definition, the real value of the commodity bundle in aggregate remains the same over time. The real values of individual goods or commodities may rise or fall against each other, in relative terms, but a representative commodity bundle as a whole retains its real value as a constant from one period to the next. 

Real values can for example be expressed in constant 1992 dollars, with the price level fixed 100 at the base date. 

The price index is applied to adjust the nominal value  of a quantity, such as wages or total production, to obtain its real value. The real value is the value expressed in terms of purchasing power in the base year.

The index price divided by its base-year value  gives the growth factor of the price index.

Real values can be found by dividing the nominal value by the growth factor of a price index. Using the price index growth factor as a divisor for converting a nominal value into a real value, the real value at time t relative to the base date is:

Real growth rate

The real growth rate  is the change in a nominal quantity  in real terms since the previous date . It measures by how much the buying power of the quantity has changed over a single period.

so

Hence as a first-order (i.e. linear) approximation,

Real wages and real gross domestic products

The bundle of goods used to measure the Consumer Price Index (CPI) is applicable to consumers. So for wage earners as consumers, an appropriate way to measure real wages (the buying power of wages) is to divide the nominal wage (after-tax) by the growth factor in the CPI. 

Gross domestic product (GDP) is a measure of aggregate output. Nominal GDP in a particular period reflects prices that were current at the time, whereas real GDP compensates for inflation. Price indices and the U.S. National Income and Product Accounts are constructed from bundles of commodities and their respective prices. In the case of GDP, a suitable price index is the GDP price index. In the U.S. National Income and Product Accounts, nominal GDP is called  GDP in current dollars (that is, in prices current for each designated year), and real GDP is called GDP in [base-year] dollars (that is, in dollars that can purchase the same quantity of commodities as in the base year).

Example

Real interest rates

As was shown in the section above on the real growth rate,

where

 is the rate of increase of a quantity in real terms,

 is the rate of increase of the same quantity in nominal terms, and

 is the rate of inflation,

and as a first-order approximation,

Looking back into the past, the ex post real interest rate is approximately the historical nominal interest rate minus inflation. Looking forward into the future, the expected real interest rate is approximately the nominal interest rate minus the expected inflation rate.

Cross-sectional comparison

Not only time-series data, as above, but also cross-sectional data which depends on prices which may vary geographically for example, can be adjusted in a similar way. For example, the total value of a good produced in a region of a country depends on both the amount and the price. To compare the output of different regions, the nominal output in a region can be adjusted by repricing the goods at common or average prices.

See also

Aggregation problem
Classical dichotomy
Constant Item Purchasing Power Accounting
Cost-of-living index
Deflation
Financial repression
Fisher equation
Index (economics)
Inflation
Inflation accounting
Inflation hedge
Interest
Money illusion
National accounts
Neutrality of money
Numéraire
Real interest rate
Real prices and ideal prices
Template:Inflation – for price conversions in Wikipedia articles

Notes

References

 (Adam Smith's early distinction vindicated)

External links
DataBasics: Deflating Nominal Values to Real Values from Federal Reserve Bank of Dallas
CPI Inflation Calculator from U.S. Bureau of Labor Statistics

Inflation
Valuation (finance)